Changsha A9 Financial District is a supertall skyscraper under construction in Changsha, Hunan, China. Construction of the building started in 2015 and is expected to be completed in 2021.

References

Buildings and structures in Changsha
Buildings and structures under construction in China
Skyscrapers in Hunan
Skyscraper office buildings in China
Residential skyscrapers in China
Retail buildings in China